Sarai Saleh is one of the 44 union councils (administrative subdivisions) of Haripur District in the Khyber Pakhtunkhwa province of Pakistan.

Sarai Saleh is located 5 kilometers northeast of Haripur City and is 597 meters above sea level. It is a mostly green valley surrounded by hills covering an area of two to three square kilometers. It is situated on the main Hazara Road, close to the Dor River and is served by a 1928 train station.

Language

The primary language spoken in the region is Hindko. Pahari is spoken by some inhabitants, generally only in private.

Education

Sarai Saleh has a high literacy rate, 76% in males 61% in females. Government and private educational institutes are located there.

References

Union councils of Haripur District